The Antalya Sports Hall is an indoor sporting arena located in Antalya, Turkey. Opened in 2016, the arena has a capacity of 10,000 spectators. It replaced the Dilek Sabancı Spor Salonu as the home of Turkish Basketball League clubs, Antalya Büyükşehir Belediyesi and Kepez Belediyespor. It is located next to the New Antalya Stadium.

External links
Venue information
FIBA - FIBA ends inspection tour in Turkey for 2010 FIBA World Championship

Indoor arenas in Turkey
Sports venues in Antalya